This list of the largest running events in the world is based on the number of participants. If available, the number of "registered" participants or finishers may be specified. Not all participants will actually complete a race. Running USA's Road Running Information Center estimates that, on average, 80%-85% of registrants will complete a race. If a yearly event has consistently high participation, the year in which that event had the largest number of participants has been listed.

With 110,000 participants, the Bay to Breakers race held on May 18, 1986 in San Francisco, California was recognized by the Guinness Book of World Records as the world's largest footrace. On October 10, 2010, 116,086 out of 160,000 registered runners in Manila were reported to have finished a run entitled "10.10.10 A Run for the Pasig River". An official for the ABS-CBN Foundation said that documentation of the event was being forwarded to Guinness World Records. The Guinness World Records certified Run for the Pasig River as having the most participants in a racing event on December 26, 2010.
Since 2014 the Wings for Life World Run is the largest run, though not confirmed by Guinness World Records. The charity run is taking place worldwide at the very same time always on the second weekend in May.

Largest running events

See also

References 

Long-distance running competitions
Largest running events
Running Events